Vertavo String Quartet is a Norwegian group founded in Hamar in 1984. The four women forming the quartet are Øyvor Volle, Annabelle Meare, Berit Cardas, and Bjørg Lewis. They appeared on the album A Portrait of Jon Larsen.

External links
Home page

Musical groups established in 1984
Norwegian musical groups
String quartets
Spellemannprisen winners
Simax Classics artists